Kazakhstan competed at the 2002 Winter Olympics in Salt Lake City, United States.

Alpine skiing

Men

Women

Biathlon

Men

Women

 1 A penalty loop of 150 metres had to be skied per missed target. 
 3 One minute added per missed target. 
 4 Starting delay based on 7.5 km sprint results.

Cross-country skiing

Men
Sprint

Pursuit

 1 Starting delay based on 10 km C. results. 
 C = Classical style, F = Freestyle

4 × 10 km relay

Women
Sprint

Pursuit

 2 Starting delay based on 5 km C. results. 
 C = Classical style, F = Freestyle

4 × 5 km relay

Freestyle skiing

Men

Ice hockey

Women's tournament

Group stage - group A
Top two teams (shaded) advanced to semifinals.

Classification round
Fifth place semifinal

7th place match

Ski jumping 

Men's team large hill

 1 Four teams members performed two jumps each.

Speed skating

Men

Women

References

External links
 Official Olympic Reports
 Olympic Winter Games 2002, full results by sports-reference.com

Nations at the 2002 Winter Olympics
2002
2002 in Kazakhstani sport